Desmocaris, also referred to as Nigerian Floating Shrimp, is a genus of crustaceans belonging to the monotypic family Desmocarididae.

The species of this genus are found in Central Africa  and in the forest zone of West Africa. 

Species:

Desmocaris bislineata 
Desmocaris bisliniata 
Desmocaris trispinosa

References

Decapods
Decapod genera